Finlay McNaughton Young (2 April 1852 – 15 February 1916) was a Canadian senator.

Born in St. Chrysostome, Canada East, the son of Duncan Young, he was educated at St. Chrysostome and Montreal. In 1879, he moved to Manitoba. A farmer, he was first elected to the Legislative Assembly of Manitoba for the electoral division of Turtle Mountain in 1883 and re-elected at all the subsequent elections up to 1899. In 1899, he was defeated. He was Speaker of the Legislative Assembly of Manitoba from 1895 to 1899.

A Liberal, he was appointed to the Senate of Canada on 30 January 1900 on the recommendation of Sir Wilfrid Laurier.  He represented the Senate division of Killarney, Manitoba, until his death.

References
 The Canadian Parliament; biographical sketches and photo-engravures of the senators and members of the House of Commons of Canada. Being the tenth Parliament, elected 3 November 1904

External links 

1852 births
1916 deaths
Canadian senators from Manitoba
Liberal Party of Canada senators
People from Montérégie
Speakers of the Legislative Assembly of Manitoba
Anglophone Quebec people